

H

H